Noviforum Ltd. is a Slovenian company that has its headquarters in Ljubljana, Slovenia. It has created the most popular search engine and portal in Slovenia called Najdi.si. It launched in April 2005.

Products 
 Interseek Technology: a search engine technology written in Java that has many features. One of them is a Google like ranking system. ( see PageRank ). For a full feature list, see here.
 IPIS: IPIS is a software, containing the biggest catalogue of various information of all Slovene business subjects (enterprises, organisations).
 IBON: iBON is a computer organized database of prudential reports and finance information gathered on a CD-ROM for Slovene businesses published since 1994.
 Najdi.si Map: much like Google Maps, only centered on Slovenia. If you want to see the map, see here.
 Najdi.si Free SMS: A tool that allows all Slovenians to send a limited number of free SMS messages per day. As of January 2012, the number of free SMSes is limited to 40.

References 

Web service providers
Companies based in Ljubljana 
Online companies of Slovenia
Database providers
Software companies of Slovenia
Slovenian brands
Slovenian companies established in 1994
Software companies established in 1994